Liberia competed at the 2012 Summer Paralympics in London, United Kingdom from August 29 to September 9, 2012.

Powerlifting 

Men

See also

 Liberia at the 2012 Summer Olympics

References

Nations at the 2012 Summer Paralympics
2012
Para